The Old Randolph County Courthouse is a historic former county courthouse at Broadway and Vance Street in the center of Pocahontas, Arkansas.  It is a two-story Italianate Victorian brick structure, built in 1872, regionally distinctive for its architectural style.  It has brick quoined corners, and a low hip roof with small central gables on each elevation, and a square cupola with flared roof.  Its eaves are studded with paired brackets and dentil moulding.  It served as the county courthouse until 1940, and has since then has housed city offices, the local public library, and other offices.

The building was listed on the National Register of Historic Places in 1973.

See also
Randolph County Courthouse, also listed, and also in Pocohontas
National Register of Historic Places listings in Randolph County, Arkansas

References

Government buildings completed in 1875
Buildings and structures in Randolph County, Arkansas
County courthouses in Arkansas
Courthouses on the National Register of Historic Places in Arkansas
Individually listed contributing properties to historic districts on the National Register in Arkansas
National Register of Historic Places in Randolph County, Arkansas